The New Guinea thornbill or Papuan thornbill (Acanthiza murina) is a species of bird in the family Acanthizidae. It is found in the New Guinea Highlands.

Its natural habitat is subtropical or tropical moist montane forests.

References

New Guinea thornbill
Birds of New Guinea
New Guinea thornbill
Taxonomy articles created by Polbot